The Swan River Rowing Club is a rowing club that was founded in 1887 in Perth, Western Australia.

It has had rowing sheds at different locations on the Swan River.

The Canning River was a location of regattas and social events for the club.

In early years regattas were held to increase interest and membership.

Social activities were an important part of the annual events.

Rivalry and differences with the West Australian Rowing Club were evident in early years of operation.

Notes

External links 

Rowing clubs in Australia
1887 establishments in Australia
Rowing in Western Australia
Perth waterfront